Shiwakumar Tyron (born 21 March 1998) is a Sri Lankan cricketer. He made his List A debut for Kurunegala Youth Cricket Club in the 2017–18 Premier Limited Overs Tournament on 10 March 2018. He made his Twenty20 debut on 6 January 2020, for Kurunegala Youth Cricket Club in the 2019–20 SLC Twenty20 Tournament.

References

External links
 

1998 births
Living people
Sri Lankan cricketers
Kurunegala Youth Cricket Club cricketers
Place of birth missing (living people)